The Baitul Huda Mosque (House of Guidance) is a mosque located in the Sydney suburb of , in New South Wales, Australia. The mosque is run by the Ahmadiyya Muslim Community (AMC).

History 
The land for the mosque at Marsden Park (Sydney) was purchased in 1983. Mirza Tahir Ahmad, Khalifatul Masih IV laid the foundation stone on 30 September on his first visit to Australia in 1983.

The first missionaries, Mr. Shakil Ahmad Munir and his wife, Mrs. Naima Munir, came to Australia on 5 July 1985. The Ahmadiyya Jamaat in Australia was registered as the Ahmadiyya Muslim Association of Australia Inc. on 7 September 1987.

The mosque was opened on the second visit of Mirza Tahir Ahmad, Khalifatul Masih IV. in July 1989.

In 2008, an extension hall was constructed to celebrate the centenary of Khilafat (successors who led the organisation).

In December 2015, Prime Minister Malcolm Turnbull acknowledged the community's contribution to Australia. Ahmadiyya Muslim Association Australia national spokesman Aziz Omer said, "We are loyal to Australia and we want our kids to be loyal to Australia", with association members delivering 500,000 Loyalty to Homeland leaflets.  Australia Day celebrations at the mosque includes a flag-raising ceremony, the singing of the national anthem and a barbecue.

See also 

 Baitul Huda (disambiguation)
 Islam in Australia
 Islamic schools and branches
 List of mosques in Oceania
 List of Ahmadiyya buildings and structures
 Ahmadiyya Muslim Mosque in Victoria, also known as Bait-Ul-Salam, serves as a community center and is located in suburb

References

External links 
 Ahmadiyya Muslim Jamaat Australia
 Photo of the Mosque on 22nd National Annual Gathering, Australia 2005

1989 establishments in Australia
Ahmadiyya mosques in Australia
Mosques completed in 1989
Mosques in Sydney